Thani Mohamed Soilihi (born 20 June 1972 in Mayotte) is a French politician who was elected to the French Senate on 25 September 2011 representing the department of Mayotte.

References

Mayotte politicians
French Senators of the Fifth Republic
1972 births
Living people
La République En Marche! politicians
People from Mayotte
Senators of Mayotte